The Zurcher Apartments in Boise, Idaho, is a 2-story, Neoclassical building designed by Tourtellotte & Hummel and completed in 1912. It was added to the National Register of Historic Places in 1982.

When it opened, the building featured four apartments, each with three rooms, a bathroom, and a Murphy bed.

Oscar Zurcher was a partner in a marble and granite company located near the Zurcher Apartments, and with his brother Otto Zurcher owned the Zurcher Brothers Grocery.

References

External links

		
National Register of Historic Places in Ada County, Idaho
Victorian architecture in Idaho
Neoclassical architecture in Idaho
Buildings and structures completed in 1912
National Register of Historic Places in Boise, Idaho
Apartment buildings in Boise, Idaho
Apartment buildings on the National Register of Historic Places in Idaho